The National Service Programme, ( - PKBN), is the voluntary national service programme in Brunei Darussalam for youth citizens aged 16 to 21. The programme lasts three months, and engagement is voluntary. It is managed by the Ministry of Culture, Youth and Sports.

History

To undertake the task, a PKBN Task Force was formed, with members from Prime Minister office, and the following Ministries: Defence, Finance, Education, Health, Industry and Prime Resources, Development, Communication, Home Affairs, Religious Affairs, Culture Youth and Sports, as well as Attorney General's Chamber.

Aims
PKBN is a unique youth development programme, aimed to awaken the potential and give consciousness to youth to become members of society who is strong, strong self-esteem, disciplined, insightful, decorum, a believer, volunteerism and entrepreneurial spirit, love for country and king, and support the concept of Melayu Islam Beraja (MIB), Wawasan Negara 2035, realising a State of Zikir, and implement Sharia Law.

Objectives of PKBN are to develop and enhance the spirit of patriotism, commitment and resilience in youths, to enhance the spirit of solidarity and unity, to develop positive characteristics among younger generation through good values, to instil a spirit of caring and volunteerism, to produce healthy, confident, responsible and virtuous youths, and to produce excellent Bruneian youths in line with the Goals of National Youth Policy.

"The state wants to see coaches serve as role models, encouragement, mentoring, and a catalyst in the development of families, communities and countries which include social welfare, society, entrepreneurial and religious", as described by the Minister of Culture, Youth and Sports; Pehin Orang Kaya Pekerma Laila Diraja Dato Seri Setia Awang Haji Abdullah bin Haji Hazair, during the Council Session Meeting with former trainees and trainers PKBN.

Trainees play a role in maintaining peace and stability in the country and care on community welfare.  Implementation PKBN is intended to be a national youth development programme, with extensive filling and create a vibrant patriotic youth, love of the king, race, religion, and country.

Former PKBN trainees is a pioneer and mentor to new trainees.  The presence of former PKBN trainees, and the availability of a large number of them to return to training camp PKBN to voluntarily working with coaches and supervisors in the township PKBN is clear evidence that PKBN have successfully established identity, discipline, commitment and character of youth willing to serving the community.  Indeed, young graduates PKBN is 'Pride of a Nation', and be able to lift the image of the country as youths disciplined, caring, insightful, and patriotism.

Training
The PKBN's three months' training process is to train the trainee in the form of discipline, nationality, spirituality, entrepreneurship, community, and understanding the concept of Malay Islamic Monarchy (MIB), and does not stop once the trainees graduate and leave the training camp PKBN.  In the end, the trainees are urged to continue to practice and to contribute to the family, community, and country full, with the knowledge and skills and experience learned and earned during training.

New Base Training Camp

The current PKBN Base Training Camp is at the Sports Village in Berakas, near to the Indoor Stadium and the Sports School.  In 2014, a new B$26 million camp for Programme Khidmat Bakti Negara (PKBN) was built in Kampong Batu Apoi in Temburong District.  The construction was completed in June 2014.

References

External links
National Service Programme official website 

Society of Brunei
Youth organisations based in Brunei
Military of Brunei
Military youth groups
Islamic youth organizations
Youth development organizations